Amaranthus spinosus, commonly known as the spiny amaranth, spiny pigweed, prickly amaranth or thorny amaranth, is a plant that is native to the tropical Americas, but is present on most continents as an introduced species and sometimes a noxious weed. It can be a serious weed of rice cultivation in Asia.

Uses

Dye use
In Khmer language, it is called pti banlar and in Vietnamese  and its ash was historically used as a grey cloth dye.

Food use

Like several related species, A. spinosus is a valued food plant in Africa. It is valued also in Thai cuisine, where it is called phak khom. In Tamil, it is called mullik keerai. In Sanskrit, it is called tanduliyaka. It is used as food in the Philippines, where it is called kulitis. The leaves of this plant, known as massaagu in the Maldivian language, have been used in the diet of the Maldives for centuries in dishes such as mas huni.  In Mexico, it is among the species labelled Quelite quintonil in Mexican markets.
In Bangladesh it is called "Katanote (কাটানটে)". In Manipuri, it is called" Chengkrook" and is used as food in stir-fry and in broths mixed with other vegetables.
In Mauritius it is called "Brède malbar".
The seeds are eaten by many songbirds.

Traditional medicine
In the folk medicine of India, the ash of fruits of Amaranthus spinosus is used for jaundice.  Water extracts from its roots and leaves have been used as a diuretic in Vietnam.

References

External links
 Jepson Manual Treatment
 PROTAbase on Amaranthus spinosus
 
 

spinosus
Medicinal plants of North America
Medicinal plants of South America
Plants used in traditional Chinese medicine
Flora of New Jersey
Plants used in traditional African medicine
Flora of Nepal
Plants described in 1753
Taxa named by Carl Linnaeus